Henry John McShane (9 February 1873 – 1 December 1912) was an Australian rules footballer who played with Geelong and Carlton in the Victorian Football Association (VFA) and the Victorian Football League (VFL).

His brothers Jim and Joe also played VFL football with Geelong and Carlton.

Notes

External links 
	
		
Henry McShane's profile at Blueseum

1873 births
1912 deaths
Australian rules footballers from Geelong
Australian Rules footballers: place kick exponents
Geelong Football Club (VFA) players
Geelong Football Club players
Carlton Football Club players